The Gary F. Longman Memorial Trophy, was awarded annually by the International Hockey League to the most outstanding first year player as voted on by the league's coaches. Prior to 1968, the award was known as the Leading Rookie Award.

Winners

References
Garry F. Longman Memorial Trophy  www.azhockey.com
Garry F. Longman Memorial Trophy www.hockeydb.com

International Hockey League (1945–2001) trophies